The 2011 Belgian Super Cup is a football match that was played on 21 July 2011, between league winners Genk and the cup winners Standard Liège. Genk won the game one nil and with that won their first Super Cup, after already being on the losing end on five previous occasions.

Match details

 Match rules
90 minutes
No extra-time if scores still level, instead there will be a penalty shoot-out
7 named substitutes
Maximum of 7 substitutions

See also
Belgian Supercup

References

Standard Liège matches
K.R.C. Genk matches
2011–12 in Belgian football
2011
July 2011 sports events in Europe